Altenbeken is a municipality in the district of Paderborn, in North Rhine-Westphalia, Germany.

Geography
Altenbeken is situated in the Eggegebirge, approx. 15 km northeast of Paderborn.  To the west of the town is the Altenbeken Viaduct, a railway bridge that spans the Beke valley.

Division of the municipality
Altenbeken consists of the following 3 districts
 Altenbeken
 Buke 
 Schwaney

International relations

Altenbeken is twinned with:
 Betton (near Rennes), (France)

References

External links
 Official site 

Paderborn (district)